is a Japanese sports shooter. He competed in the men's 50 metre rifle, prone event at the 1984 Summer Olympics.

References

1955 births
Living people
Japanese male sport shooters
Olympic shooters of Japan
Shooters at the 1984 Summer Olympics
Place of birth missing (living people)
Asian Games medalists in shooting
Shooters at the 1982 Asian Games
Shooters at the 1986 Asian Games
Asian Games silver medalists for Japan
Asian Games bronze medalists for Japan
Medalists at the 1982 Asian Games
Medalists at the 1986 Asian Games
20th-century Japanese people